Landmass (2008) is an album by the American ambient musician Steve Roach.

Production
The tracks on Landmass were recorded on May 20, 2007, live on the Star's End radio program in Philadelphia, Pennsylvania.  Only a few hours after Steve Roach had given a concert at the Episcopal Church at Penn, his equipment was moved to the WXPN studio where, beginning a little after two in the morning, Roach performed and created each track.  The sounds, themes, and sonic "sub-structures" were prepared ahead of time, and the tracks were later edited for length prior to their release.

Release
Landmass was chosen to be the 20th release on Steve Roach's Timeroom Editions label, which also celebrated its 10th anniversary in 2008.

Track listing

Personnel
Steve Roach (synthesizers)

References

External links
 Landmass at SteveRoach.com
 Landmass at Projekt Records

2008 live albums
Steve Roach (musician) live albums